Vicente López Carril (2 December 1942, A Coruña, province of A Coruña – 29 March 1980, Gijón, Asturias) was a Spanish professional road racing cyclist from A Coruña. He finished among the top ten riders in the overall classification of several Grand Tours and third in 1974 Tour de France. During his career he also won three stages of Tour de France, as well as a stage in both Giro d'Italia and Vuelta a España.

Major results

1971
Trofeo Elola
Giro d'Italia:
Winner stage 5
Tour de France:
10th place overall classification
1972
GP Navarra
1973
Tour de France:
Winner stage 9
9th place overall classification
1974
Le Creusot
 National Road Race Championship
Tour de France:
Winner stage 11
3rd place overall classification
1975
Saussignac
Vuelta a Levante
Tour de France:
Winner stage 17
5th place overall classification
1976
Vuelta a España:
Winner stage 15
Tour de France:
10th place overall classification
1977
GP Navarra
Klasika Primavera
Prueba Villafranca de Ordizia
Vuelta Ciclista Asturias

See also
 List of doping cases in cycling

External links

1942 births
1980 deaths
Sportspeople from A Coruña
Cyclists from Galicia (Spain)
Spanish Tour de France stage winners
Spanish Giro d'Italia stage winners
Spanish Vuelta a España stage winners
Doping cases in cycling
Spanish male cyclists